Bala Niganda is a village in Balozai tehsil, Pishin District of Balochistan, Pakistan.

References

Villages in Pakistan
Pishin District